Eldon Quinn Johnson (August 16, 1930 – September 4, 2015) was an American politician who was a Republican member of the Oregon House of Representatives. He was appointed in September 1977 to fill the House District 51 seat vacated by Representative Brad Morris. He was unable to continue to serve in Oregon Legislature due to terms limits enacted by voters in the 1992 General Election, later ruled  unconstitutional by the Oregon Supreme Court in 2002. His 11th and final term in office ended January 10, 1999. Johnson was born in West Point, Nebraska and attended school in Tucson, Arizona. He was an electrical and plumbing supply company owner, tile setter and farmer. He also served in the United States Air Force.

References

1930 births
2015 deaths
People from West Point, Nebraska
Politicians from Medford, Oregon
Businesspeople from Oregon
Republican Party members of the Oregon House of Representatives
20th-century American businesspeople